"Let Me Down Easy" is a song written by Mark Nesler, Jennifer Hanson and Marty Dodson and recorded by American country music artist Billy Currington. It was released in October 2010 as the second single from Currington's 2010 album Enjoy Yourself and as the eleventh single of his career. The song became Currington's fourth consecutive and sixth number one hit on the U.S. Billboard Hot Country Songs chart for the week of April 2, 2011.

Music video
The music video was directed by Potsy Ponciroli. It is composed entirely of tour footage, showing Currington performing both at soundcheck, and at the actual show. It was released on March 28, 2011, just before its U.S. country peak of Number One.

Critical reception
Karlie Justus of Engine 145 gave the song a thumbs-up, saying that it was a "sultry sleeper hit" but also saying that she thought it was similar to "Must Be Doin' Somethin' Right" and "Don't". Gary Graff of Billboard also described the song favorably, saying that it had "Lionel Richie-style smoothness".

Chart performance

Weekly charts

Year-end charts

Decade-end charts

References

2010 singles
Billy Currington songs
Country ballads
2010s ballads
Songs written by Mark Nesler
Songs written by Jennifer Hanson
Song recordings produced by Carson Chamberlain
Mercury Nashville singles
2010 songs
Songs written by Marty Dodson